Joker in the Pack is a 2007 novel by Neeraj Pahlajani and Ritesh Sharma.

Joker in the Pack may also refer to:

 Joker in the Pack, an album by The Adicts
 "Joker in the Pack", a song The Adicts from Live and Loud